Democratic Alliance was a Swedish anti-Socialist organisation. It was known for its support of the United States in the Vietnam War, the support for NATO and strong criticism of Olof Palme then Prime Minister of Sweden.

The heritage of DA has been passed on by Contra, a foundation which publishes a magazine by the same name. It takes libertarian and conservative positions and claims credit for introducing the ideas of Milton Friedman in Sweden.

Leading members of DA have been Carl G Holm, founder of the magazine Contra, and Tommy Hansson, currently editor of Contra.

Political history of Sweden
Anti-communist organizations
Anti-communism in Sweden